Pascal Behrenbruch (born 19 January 1985 in Offenbach am Main) is a German decathlete. He is a member of the Eintracht Frankfurt athletics team and placed tenth at the 2012 Olympic Games.

He was the runner-up at the Décastar meeting in Talence in September 2010, collecting a season's best 8202 points.

Away from the track, Behrenbruch studied economics and computer science at university and now lives and trains in Tallinn, Estonia. His coach is Andrei Nazarov.

Achievements

References

External links 

  
 
 
 
 

1985 births
Living people
Sportspeople from Offenbach am Main
German decathletes
Eintracht Frankfurt athletes
Athletes (track and field) at the 2012 Summer Olympics
Olympic athletes of Germany
European Athletics Championships medalists